Seven Little Australians is a 1939 Australian film directed by Arthur Greville Collins and starring Charles McCallum. It is an adaptation of Ethel Turner's 1894 novel in a contemporary setting.

Synopsis
Seven children live with their tyrannical father, Captain McCallum, and step mother Esther. The children can never make their father happy. The second oldest girl, Judy, is sent to boarding school.

Judy runs away and falls ill. She is found by her father who allows her to go on holiday in the country to recuperate. The other children come along with her.

Judy is killed by a falling branch. The Captain becomes aware of how he has mistreated his family.

Cast

Charles McCallum as Captain Woolcot
Patricia McDonald as Esther
Sandra Jaques as Meg
Robert Gray as Pip
Mary McGowan as Judy
Janet Gleeson as Nell
Ronald Rousel as Bunty
Nancy Gleeson as Baby
Donald Tall as the General
Harold Meade as Colonel Bryant
Nan Taylor as Mrs Bryant
John Wiltshire as Gillet
John Fernside as doctor
Edna Montgomery as Aldith
Howard Craven as Andrew
Letty Craydon as Martha
George Doran as groom
Nesta Tait as Bridget
Carl Francis as Fred Hassel
Connie Martyn as Mary Hassel
Nellie Lamport as school teacher
Mary Swan as Marion
Jean Hart as Betty
Margaret Roussel as Doris
Richard Dowse as Major Martin
Norman Wait as Mr Hill
Eve Wynne as Mrs Hill

Production
It was originally announced the movie would be made by noted theatre producer Sir Benjamin Fuller, his first exercise into movie making. Fuller said it would be part of a slate of projects, also including the story of Father Damien of Molokai and an adaptation of Norman Lindsay's novel Redheap. Fuller hired English director Arthur Greville Collins, who had directed several Hollywood films arrived in May 1939 to begin preproduction. Collins later said he was visiting Sydney on holiday when he read the book and decided to turn it into a film.

The original plan was to cast one child from each of the six states of Australia, and one from New Zealand. The children who were cast had a variety of experience – Mary McGrown, Ron Rousel and Sandra Jacque had a background in amateur theatre and radio; sisters Janet and Nancy Gleeson were pantomime and radio veterans at the age of seven.

The script updated the story from 1894 to the 1930s. "Although the story has been modernised " said Collins, "we have made every effort to retain the same freshness and vivacity that has made the book such a definite part of Australian fiction."

Despite announcements of Fuller's involvement, the film was eventually produced by O.B. Pictures, a Sydney company headed by businessman Edward O'Brien. They announced plans to make a series of other films with Collins.

Shooting started in August 1939 and took place on location at Camden and in the studios of the Commonwealth Film Laboratories in Sydney. It took five weeks in all.

Reception
Critical reaction was generally poor and the film was not a financial success.

References

External links
Seven Little Australians in the Internet Movie Database
Seven Little Australians at National Film and Sound Archive
Seven Little Australians at Oz Movies

1939 films
Australian black-and-white films
Australian drama films
1939 drama films
Films directed by Arthur Greville Collins
1930s Australian films
1930s English-language films